Declaration Tour is the first solo headline tour of the American rock singer-songwriter David Cook, who rose to fame after winning the seventh season of American Idol. There were 152 shows in this tour, not including an extra show in Manila in the Philippines, a record for an Idol debut tour.  The tour earned an average gross of $46,263 per show.

Background
The tour supported Cook's platinum  self-titled album. The tour is named after "Declaration", the first track from the album and started on February 13, 2009, in Tallahassee, Florida, following Cook's appearance at Walt Disney World Resort's The American Idol Experience attraction. The tour was originally due to end on April 25, 2009, but had since been extended twice to finish until the end of year.

"I’m more than excited to hop on the road and support this record. This tour represents both a new beginning and a return to form for me," David says. "It's our first full tour, and we’re all ready to pour whatever blood, sweat, and tears that we can muster into making this show, and every show from here on out, an experience. Part of that experience is bringing back this college tour idea. There's something inherently nostalgic about playing college shows. So many amazing acts used to do it, so it's nice to be able to bring that ideal back, in some small way. And besides, touring on a bus beats what we used to do, which was cram five guys into a seven passenger van for one show, 13 hours away..."

Cook was originally supported on the tour with musicians Neal Tiemann (lead guitar, backing vocals), Andy Skib (rhythm guitar, keyboards, backing vocals), Kyle Peek (drums, backing vocals), and Joey Clement (bass guitar). Clement however was replaced by Monty Anderson on July 27, 2009, for the rest of the tour.

Opening acts

Ryan Star
Needtobreathe
Green River Ordinance
Matt Nathanson
Gin Blossoms

Crash Kings
Tonic
The Script
Hot Chelle Rae

Others who opened for David Cook include his friends from Tulsa; Bryan Jewett and Phil Marshall.

Set list

(Songs varied between shows and selected from the following list)
"Heroes"
"We're Only Honest When We're Sleeping"
"Mr. Sensitive"
"Breathe Tonight"
"Little Lies" (Fleetwood Mac cover)
"Lie"
"Declaration"
"My Last Request"
"Permanent"
"Make Me"
"Kiss on the Neck" (sometimes w/"Hotel California" 
"Straight Ahead"
"I Did It for You"
"Billie Jean" 
"Avalanche" 
"Come Back To Me"
"Life on the Moon" 
"Hot for Teacher" (Van Halen cover)
"Livin' on a Prayer" (Bon Jovi cover, sometimes acoustic)
"Anodyne" (Midwest Kings cover)
"Light On"
"Hunger Strike" (Temple of the Dog cover)
"Man in the Box" (Alice in Chains cover, sometimes acoustic)
"The Truth"
"The World I Know" (Collective Soul cover)
"Souvenir"
"Always Be My Baby" (Mariah Carey cover)
"Silver"
Bar-ba-sol"
"A Daily AntheM"
"Last Train Home"
"Shattered Dreams" (Johnny Hates Jazz cover)
"Til I'm Blue" (Midwest Kings cover)
"(I Just) Died in Your Arms" (Cutting Crew cover)
"Make Believe"
"My Hero" (Foo Fighters cover)
"Every Day Is Exactly the Same" (Nine Inch Nails cover)

Tour dates

Band
Neal Tiemann: Lead guitar, backing vocals
Andy Skib: Rhythm guitar, keyboards, backing vocals
Joey Clement: Bass guitar (Left tour midway, replaced by Monty Anderson)
Monty Anderson: Bass guitar (replaced Clement on July 27, 2009, for the rest of the tour)
Kyle Peek: Drums, backing vocals

References

External links
 David Cook Official Site

2009 concert tours
David Cook (singer) concert tours